Ponde is a locality in the Murraylands region of South Australia, on the inside of a bend on the left bank of the Murray River. Its name is derived from the Ngarrindjeri name for the Murray cod.

Ponde was the site of an annual music festival from 1979 to 2002.

References

Towns in South Australia